Michael Pickett may refer to:
 Michael Pickett (musician)
 Michael Pickett (swimmer)